The bloodfin tetra (Aphyocharax anisitsi) is a species of characin from the Paraná River basin in South America. The bloodfin is a relatively large tetra, growing to 5.5 cm. Its notable feature (as the name suggests) is the blood-red colouration of the tail, dorsal, anal and adipose fin, while the body is silver in color.

Bloodfin tetras are extremely hardy, making them popular with novice fish keepers.

Aquarium care
Bloodfin tetras are typically kept in schools of five or more. They swim mainly in the upper and middle water layers and are highly sociable fishes, mixing well with other types of tetras and tropical fish in general, so are often kept (like many other tetras) in a community tank. However, they will tend to nip at the fins of fish with long, wavy fins, such as angelfish or guppies. Bloodfin tetras have also been kept in cold-water tanks, provided the temperature does not drop below room temperature. They have been kept in temperatures ranging from 64–83 °F. Tetras are adapted to soft, slightly acidic water, and soft water is essential for breeding. Bloodfin tetras can adapt to many water conditions in captivity, if the tap water is dechlorinated.

Breeding
At the time of spawning the fish leaps above the water surface and leaves its eggs in the water. The eggs, being heavy, fall to the floor of the tank or water body. The female deposits 300–500 eggs.

See also
List of freshwater aquarium fish species

References

Tetras
Fish described in 1903